Muhammad Abdul 'Ati (born 27 December 1963) is an Egyptian civil engineer, and a former Egyptian Minister of Irrigation and Water Resources.

Early life and career
Muhammad Abdul Ati received his Bachelor of Engineering from Cairo University in 86 and his Ph.D. from Ain Shams University. He worked as head of the projects sector at the National Bank, lived for a time in Ethiopia, and participated in a study committee for  the Renaissance Dam project.

Awards
Abdul Ati won the Le prix Gaïa International Prize in Water Resources.

References

 

1963 births
Irrigation Ministers of Egypt
Ain Shams University alumni
Cairo University alumni
Egyptian Muslims 
Living people